Joseph Shorrocks (born 25 November 1999) is a professional rugby league footballer who plays as a  or  for Leigh Leopards, on short-term loan from the Wigan Warriors in the Betfred Super League.

He has spent time on loan from Wigan at the London Skolars in Betfred League 1.

Background
Shorrocks was born in Billinge Higher End, Wigan, England

Playing career
Shorrocks made his club debut for Wigan in round 10 of the 2019 Super League season against Wakefield Trinity. Shorrocks made 28 appearances for Wigan in the 2021 Super League season including their playoff loss to Leeds. In the 2022 Super League, Shorrocks played 20 games but did not feature in the clubs 2022 Challenge Cup final victory over Huddersfield.

References

External links

Wigan Warriors profile

1999 births
Living people
English rugby league players
Leigh Leopards players
London Skolars players
Rugby league locks
Rugby league players from Wigan
Wigan Warriors players